Tycoon: A New Russian is a 2002 Russian movie directed by Pavel Loungine (or Lungin). The movie is based on the book The Lion’s Share (Bolshaya Paika) by Yuli Dubov, who later went on to work for oligarch, Boris Abramovich Berezovsky.

Plot
During the Mikhail Gorbachev years, Platon Makovsky and four buddies of his are university students who jump on the private capitalism movement. Fast-forward 20 years, Platon finds himself the richest man in Russia. But as such, he and his friends are drawn more and more into relations with suspect organizations. They also have to face ever more brutal attempts to subjugate them by the Kremlin. Makovsky attempts to compete with this ever-present political power, by becoming as "creating a Kremlin" himself.

Characters 
 Platon Makovsky - Vladimir Mashkov
  Mariya Mironova

Background
The film is based on "Bolshaya Paika" ("The Big Slice") - a novel by Yuli Dubov, depicting the real biography of Russian tycoon Boris Berezovsky and his partners. Dubov was Berezovsky's partner himself, and a president of his LogoVAZ company. The novel is claimed to be historically precise in many aspects. The names of the characters were changed from their real life counterparts, though keeping resemblance (e.g. Boris Berezovsky, who changed his name to Platon Elenin in exile in 2004, to Platon Makovsky, Badri Patarkatsishvili to Lari Teishvili, etc.)

In June 2009, Dubov and Berezovsky were convicted in absentia (at that time, they were both living in exile in England) in a Russian court for the events that served as the basis for the book to 9 and 13 years of imprisonment respectively. The book served as one of the pieces of evidence against them.

Reception

Critical response
Tycoon has an approval rating of 46% on review aggregator website Rotten Tomatoes, based on 35 reviews, and an average rating of 5.60/10. The website's critical consensus states, "Wants to be The Godfather, but the movie's Citizen Kane-style narrative limits its effectiveness". It also has a score of 49 out of 100 on Metacritic, based on 17 critics, indicating "mixed of average".

The New Yorker stated: "Once a freedom-loving idealist, Platon used his genius to become a monster, unhesitatingly sacriﬁcing his ideals and his closest friends.

See also
 Shock doctrine

References

External links
 

2002 films
Russian crime drama films
Films about businesspeople
Films about the Russian Mafia
Films directed by Pavel Lungin
Films set in the 1980s
Films set in the 1990s
Films set in Moscow
Films set in Siberia
Films shot in Russia
Films scored by Leonid Desyatnikov